John Murray Mitchell may refer to:
J. Murray Mitchell (1928–1990), United States climatologist
John M. Mitchell (1858–1905), United States Representative from New York
John Murray Mitchell (missionary) (1815–1904), missionary and orientalist

See also
John Mitchell (disambiguation)